The following lists the national swimming records for Singapore. They are the fastest times ever swum by a Singaporean in each long-course (50 m) event.

These records are kept/maintained by the country's national federation for swimming/aquatic sports: the Singapore Swimming Association.

Long course (50 m)

Men

Women

Mixed relay

Short course (25 m)

Men

Women

Mixed relay

Notes

References
General
Singaporean Long Course Records – Men 30 July 2022 updated
Singaporean Long Course Records – Women 19 June 2022 updated
Singaporean Short Course Records – Men 17 December 2022
Singaporean Short Course Records – Women 16 December 2022 updated
Specific

External links
Singapore Swimming Association

Singapore
Records
Swimming
Swimming